Ozhalai village is an Indian settlement situated in Vellore district, Tamil Nadu.

Villages in Vellore district